Oğuzhan Kayar (born 2 April 1995) is a Turkish professional footballer who plays as an attacking midfielder for Tarsus İdman Yurdu. He can also play as a winger.

Club career

Galatasaray
On 30 January 2014, Galatasaray signed a four-year contract with Oğuzhan from Manisaspor for €750.000. He made his debut for Galatasaray in 2013–14 Turkish Cup against Antalyaspor, which ended 0–0 draw. Oğuzhan started as a left winger and played 90 minutes in that match.

Loan to Manisaspor
On 14 August 2014, Galatasaray loaned Oğuzhan to his former club Manisaspor until 30 June 2015. In the 2014–15 season, he played 25 league matches and scored 4 goals, also made an assist. Also in 2014–15 Turkish Cup, he played 9 matches and scored a goal against Çorum Belediyespor.

Loan to Gaziantep BB
On 11 August 2015, Galatasaray loaned Oğuzhan to Gaziantep Büyükşehir Belediyespor until 30 December 2015. He played 11 league matches and scored 2 goals, also made an assist for his team. Oğuzhan did not replace in Turkish Cup for Gaziantep BB.

Loan to Şanlıurfaspor
On 7 January 2016, Galatasaray loaned Oğuzhan to Şanlıurfaspor until 30 June 2016.

References

External links

1995 births
People from Aydın
Living people
Turkish footballers
Turkey youth international footballers
Association football midfielders
Manisaspor footballers
Galatasaray S.K. footballers
Gaziantep F.K. footballers
Şanlıurfaspor footballers
Aydınspor footballers
Bandırmaspor footballers
Utaş Uşakspor footballers
Sakaryaspor footballers
Tarsus Idman Yurdu footballers
TFF First League players
TFF Second League players